J. R. Harris may refer to:

 Judith Rich Harris (1938–2018), psychologist
 J. Rendel Harris (1852–1941), biblical scholar